The Stellenbosch University Choir is a Choir affiliated with Stellenbosch University. Founded in 1936, it is the oldest choir in South Africa. The choir is viewed as a leading South African choral ensemble and has toured overseas extensively where it has won critical acclaim for its performances. The current conductor, André van der Merwe, was appointed at the beginning of 2003.

History
The choir was founded in 1936 by William Morris and has established itself as one of the best choirs in South Africa and the world.

Conductors 
The current conductor of the choir is André van der Merwe (since 2003). Previous conductors include William Morris (1936-1939), who founded the choir in 1936, Gawie Cillie (1939-1955), Prof. Philip McLachlan (1956-1975), Prof. Johan de Villiers (1976-1984), Acama Fick (1985-1992), the first woman to conduct the choir, and Sonja van der Walt (1993-2002).

Notable Achievements

Interkultur World Rankings
As of 2020, the Stellenbosch University Choir is rated as the top amateur choir in the world by the Interkultur Foundation world ranking system, with a maximum possible score of 1272 points, a position the choir has held since October 2012 The choir is also placed in the top 10 rankings for various categories, namely, first in the Mixed Choirs category (1272 points), first in the Sacred Music & Music of the Religions category (1233 points), and first in the Pop, Jazz, Gospel, Spiritual & Barber Shop category (1234 points).

World Choir Games
The choir first attended the Interkultur World Choir Games in 2004, at the 3rd World Choir Games held in Bremen, Germany.

Because of their conductor, André van der Merwe, being appointed as the chairperson of the National Artistic Committee for the 2018 World Choir Games held in Tshwane, South Africa, the choir did not participate in the competition. The choir did however perform as a demonstration- and show choir during the event.

* World Choir Games record

Llangollen International Musical Eisteddfod 

The choir's first attendance of the Llangollen International Musical Eisteddfod, in Llangollen, Wales was in 2018 where they won all three categories they competed in. The choir was also invited to perform in the coveted International Celebration Concert at the event.

Other 
At the 9th World Choir Games in 2016, the choir was awarded the Hänssler-INTERKULTUR CD Award, as the best choir at the event. The award includes an album deal with the Hänssler Classic record label.

References 

Musical groups established in 1936
Choir
University choirs
South African choirs
1936 establishments in South Africa